Harry John Kember Jr. (April 28, 1934 – February 9, 2012) was an American politician.

Born in Destrehan, Louisiana, Kember graduated from Ascension Catholic High School in 1952 and lived in White Castle, Louisiana. He served in the Louisiana National Guard and on the Atchafalaya Basin Levy Board. Kember served in the Louisiana House of Representatives from 1980 to 1987, and was a Democrat. Kember was convicted of mail fraud and bribery and was sentenced to prison.

Kember died in 2012, aged 77. A widower, he was survived by five children and fifteen grandchildren, and a large extended family.

Notes

1934 births
2012 deaths
Catholics from Louisiana
People from White Castle, Louisiana
People from Destrehan, Louisiana
Louisiana National Guard personnel
Democratic Party members of the Louisiana House of Representatives
Louisiana politicians convicted of crimes